This is a list of mayors (Stadtpräsident) of St. Gallen, Switzerland.

Recent

Earlier

The offices of mayor ("Amtsbürgermeister"), "Altbürgermeister" and "Reichsvogt" used to be held by three persons, alternating the offices every year.

References
Swiss Cantons O-S

St Gallen
St. Gallen (city)